The first season of Australian reality television series Lego Masters premiered on the Nine Network on 28 April 2019. Hamish Blake was announced as host and Ryan "The Brickman" McNaught was announced as Judge.

Production

Auditions for the series opened in June 2018, however no network had commissioned it at that time, filming would take place between October and December. The series was commissioned in July 2018 by the Nine Network, The series was officially confirmed at Nine's Upfronts in October 2018, also announcing the series will be hosted Hamish Blake.

The season was sponsored by Lego, Honda, Kmart and The a2 Milk Company.

Teams

Elimination history

Notes
* Matt and Lynn played the golden brick that they won in episode 1. Therefore, they were safe from elimination.

Series Details

Challenge 1

Airdate - 28 April 2019
Challenge: "Mega Cities" - Each of the eight teams had to create a city block (to connect to an already built city) in 15 hours, then they were tasked with an additional 3 hours to show their building under attack.
Advantage - The winner of the challenge received "The Golden Brick", which they can use to keep them safe from a future Elimination Challenge.

Notes
* As Jimmy & Maddy's design was already under attack, they were tasked to make the city's defence.

Challenge 2

Airdate - 29 April 2019
Challenge: "Blockbuster" - Each of the eight teams had 7 hours to create a space themed design, after which would be destroyed in 1 of 4 types of ways. The challenge winner received immunity.

Challenge 3

Airdate - 30 April 2019
Challenge: "Cut in Half" - Each of the teams had 10 hours to build a second half of an object that had been cut in half. The team with the weakest design was eliminated.

Challenge 4

Airdate - 5 May 2019
Advantage Challenge: "Break and Make" - Teams were given 4 hours to take a pre-constructed parrot apart and build something new with all 1,600 pieces. The winner of the challenge received an advantage of an extra hour for the elimination challenge.
Elimination Challenge: "Apartment" - The Teams were given 11 hours to create an apartment complex with three flights of floors. The team with the weakest design was eliminated.

Challenge 5

Airdate - 6 May 2019
Challenge: "Bridge" - Teams had 10 hours to build a 2 metre Lego bridge that could support itself and additional weights of 8 kg; tiebreaker winners would be determined by aesthetic. The winners won advantage of immunity from the next elimination challenge.

Challenge 6

Airdate - 7 May 2019
Challenge: "Evil Lair" - The teams had 13 hours to build an Evil Villain's Lair, complete with a getaway vehicle and a lair containing booby traps, an escape path and a "Mega Weapon". The team with the weakest design was eliminated.

Challenge 7

Airdate - 12 May 2019
Advantage Challenge: "Delorean" - The teams had to build an exact replica of The DeLorean from Back to the Future, with the team who designed it the most accurately winning immunity from the Elimination Challenge.
Elimination Challenge: "Classic Movie Scene" - Contestants had 10 hours to create an iconic scene from a movie of their choice. The team with the weakest design would be eliminated.

Challenge 8

Airdate - 13 May 2019
Challenge: "Time Train" - The four remaining teams had 16 hours to build a world based on four different eras – The Future, Prehistoric, Medieval, the Wild West, as a train travelled effortlessly through each of the builds. The team with weakest design was eliminated.

Grand Final

Airdate - 14 May 2019
Grand Final Challenge - Over 28 hours, remaining contestants were tasked with building something of their own choice; yet still needing to adhere to the criteria of technical skills, story-telling elements and overall aesthetic. The Team with the most votes would win the competition and receive $100,000 AUD.
Voting & Judgment - Assisting Brickman in judging was Senior Design Manager at LEGO, Fenella Charity. The 250 members of the public, as well as past contestants, were also going to be judging, assigning their Black Bricks (worth 1 vote) to whichever model they liked most. Completing the vote, Brickman and Fenella were each given a Golden Brick worth 50 votes.

Ratings

References

2019 Australian television seasons